Jadílson Carlos da Silva or simply Jadílson (born October 14, 1980) is a Brazilian striker. Today he is clubless.

Honours
 Campeonato Pernambucano in 2006, 2007 and 2008 with Sport Club do Recife
 Copa do Brasil in 2008 with Sport Club do Recife

External links
 Sport Club do Recife Official Site
 sambafoot
 CBF
 zerozero.pt

1980 births
Living people
Brazilian footballers
Club Athletico Paranaense players
Sport Club do Recife players
Association football forwards
Sportspeople from Recife